Newkidd, also stylized as NewKidd, is a South Korean boy band formed by J-Flo Entertainment. The group is composed of eight members: Jinkwon, Ji Han-sol, Choi Ji-ann, Yunmin, Hwi, Woochul, Lee Min-wook and Kang Seung-chan. The group officially debuted on April 25, 2019, with their self-titled single album Newkidd.

Name
Newkidd stands for "New generation key of dream".

History

2017–2019: Pre-debut
In 2017, J-Flo Entertainment formed Newkidd as a pre-debut project with four members, Ji Han-sol, Yunmin, Jinkwon, and Woochul. Ji Han-sol is also a former SM Entertainment trainee who joined while still completing promotions with UNB, a boy group formed by the KBS reality show The Unit. Prior to debut, the label announced the release of a pre-debut single entitled "Will You Be Ma".

On July 10, 2018, two new members were added to the lineup: Hwi, and Choi Ji-ann. They began promoting as Newkidd02 for their second pre-debut single album Boy Boy Boy. The group's final member, Kang Seung-chan, was added shortly before debut.

2019-present: Debut with Newkidd and group hiatus
On the April 23, 2019, Newkidd held a debut showcase ahead of their debut on April 25. They debuted with the self-titled album Newkidd featuring the title track "Tu eres". Following their debut, they promoted on music shows such as M Countdown, Music Bank, Inkigayo, and Show Champion.

On February 20, 2021, J-FLO Entertainment announced that Hansol would be enlisting as a public service worker. Returning in November 2022.

On April 11, 2022, Woochul and Yunmin was revealed as one of the Korean members, of an upcoming Thai-Korean boy group. The boy group would be formed by the Thai survival show Seven Stars, which started airing on July 2, 2022.

On July 28, 2022, the news of Minwook addition was announced via Newkidd's official Twitter.

On August 10, 2021, Jinkwon was introduced as the 10th contestant of the survival show Wild Idol. Unfortunately, he was eliminated in the third episode and was unable to make it further in the show.

On November 1, 2022, Newkidd's agency announced that "VICTORY's" release has been postponed due to the Seoul Halloween crowd crush. and will release a single on November 7.

On November 8, 2022, J-FLO Entertainment announced that Hwi to enlist as an active duty soldier.

Influence
Newkidd cite BTS as their role models.

Members
 Jinkwon – leader, vocal
 Ji Han-sol – dance, vocal
 Choi Ji-ann – dance, vocal
 Kang Seung-chan – rap
 Lee Min-wook

Inactive
 Hwi – main vocal
 Yunmin – vice leader, dance, vocal
 Woochul – dance, vocal

Discography

Single albums

Singles

See also

References

K-pop music groups
South Korean boy bands
South Korean dance music groups
Musical groups from Seoul
Musical groups established in 2019
2019 establishments in South Korea
South Korean pop music groups